Wilmer Amina Carter High School is a high school located in Rialto, California, United States.

Organization
The school is managed by the Rialto Unified School District. It was named for American politician Wilmer Carter and was the first high school in the Inland Empire named after a living African-American woman. The school's mascot is a lion and consequently, the athletics teams are called 'Lions'.

History
School construction began in 2001 and the school opened (still unfinished) for the 2004–05 school year, with its first graduating class in 2005–06 school year.

Facilities
The two-story facility has eighteen buildings and includes a football stadium that seats over 2,500, a performing arts theatre that accommodates over 800, a multipurpose room (MPR) that accommodates over 600, and a three full-court gymnasium with the capacity for 2,400 spectators. 

Carter High School also has a joint-use County Public Library on its campus that is open for students to use throughout the school day and Monday through Thursday from 3:00 p.m. to 8:00 p.m. and on Saturdays from 8:00 a.m. to 4:00 p.m. In addition, CHS has a dedicated science building that includes four full science labs for hands-on lessons. The school has five full computer labs and a mobile computer lab that is used for English Learner (EL) instruction in the ELD III classroom.

Notable alumni 
 Kenny Clark (defensive_tackle), NFL Player with Green Bay Packers, alumni of UCLA. Pick 27 of 2016 Draft.

References

External links
 

High schools in San Bernardino County, California
International Baccalaureate schools in California
Public high schools in California
2004 establishments in California
Educational institutions established in 2004